The 1992 Southwest Texas State Bobcats football team was an American football team that represented Southwest Texas State University (now known as Texas State University) during the 1992 NCAA Division I-AA football season as a member of the Southland Conference (SLC). In their first year under head coach Jim Bob Helduser, the team compiled an overall record of 5–5–1 with a mark of 2–4–1 in conference play.

Schedule

References

Southwest Texas State
Texas State Bobcats football seasons
Southwest Texas State Bobcats football